The 2019 FIA European Rallycross Championship was the 44th season of the FIA European Rallycross Championship. The season consists of eight rounds across two categories; Supercar and Super1600. The season commenced on 26 April with the Spanish round at the Circuit de Barcelona-Catalunya, and culminated on 14 September in Latvia at the Biķernieku Kompleksā Sporta Bāze.

Calendar
The 2019 calendar was unveiled on 25 October 2018

Calendar changes
The Euro RX of Portugal was dropped from the calendar.
The Euro RX of Great Britain returned after a one-year hiatus at the Silverstone Circuit, the event had previously been held at the Lydden Hill Race Circuit.
The Euro RX of Belgium moved from the Circuit Jules Tacheny Mettet to the Circuit de Spa-Francorchamps and was renamed to the Euro RX of Benelux.
The Euro RX of Germany became a standalone event and moved from October to August.

Entry Lists

Supercar

Super1600

Results and standings
Championship points are scored as follows:

A red background denotes drivers who did not advance from the round

Supercar

a – Loss of 10 championship points.

Super1600

a Loss of 15 championship points – stewards' decision.
b Loss of 5 championship points – stewards' decision.

References

External links
 Official website

European Rallycross Championship seasons
European Rallycross Championship
FIA European Rallycross Championship